The Le Mans Classic is a biennial vintage sports car event held on the grounds of the 24 Hours of Le Mans, created by Peter Auto and Richard Mille, and associated with Automobile Club de l'Ouest (ACO). It began in 2002 and runs every two years in July on the full 13.65 km circuit also used for the annual modern day 24 Hours of Le Mans. The Le Mans Classic event of 2002 was the first time since 1923 that the full 24-hour Circuit, part of which is public road the rest of the year, was closed specifically for an event other than the annual running of the 24 heures du Mans with contemporary sportcars and prototypes, thus allowing car owners and gentleman drivers to experience what it must have been to race these cars on this circuit.

The event consists of a series of races for cars which have competed at the 24 Hours of Le Mans or for similar cars of the same model. Only cars from prior to 1979 are allowed, with all cars being broken into six different eras. To compete in the races a driver must own an FIA International Competition licence, meaning the drivers are of a professional level.

Car shows and auctions are hosted on the Bugatti Circuit grounds, with various car clubs meeting to show off machinery.

Car classes
Each class of car competes separately on the full 13.65 km Circuit de la Sarthe (Original circuit of Le Mans race). The classes are divided by era in an attempt to equalize the pace of the cars in each event. The current classes are:
 1923-1939 (pre-WWII)
 1949-1956
 1957-1961
 1962-1965
 1966-1971
 1972-1979

Le Mans Classic Japan
Beginning in 2005, the SERO organization launched the Le Mans Classic Japan event, meant to run in alternative years from the event in France.  The initial event was held at the Mine Circuit, while in 2007 it moved to the Fuji Speedway where it was part of the Japan Le Mans Challenge event.

Drivers and cars are required to fit the same qualifications as their French counterparts, meaning cars are broken into eras and drivers require competition licenses.

Previous winners

2008
In 2008, six classes competed in separate races. The first class was won by a Talbot 105 driven by Gareth Burnett and Julian Bronson. Class 2 was won by a Jaguar C-Type driven by Vary Paerson and Nigel Webb, while Class 3 featured the same drivers winning in a D-Type, although this was based on laps total. A Saab 93 driven by Fredrik Tornérhielm, Bo Lindman and Göran Dahlén won the class based on adjusted performance and came second in total. A Ford GT40 driven by Christian Glasel won Class 4 and Olivier Cazalier's Ferrari 512S won Class 5. The final class was won by a Porsche 936 driven by Jean-Marc Luco and Jürgen Barth.

References

External links

Le Mans Classic official web site
Le Mans Classic Japan site

Sports car races
24 Hours of Le Mans
Historic motorsport events